Sumitra Devi (September 25, 1922 – February 3, 2001) was an Indian National Congress politician from Bihar. She was first elected to Bihar Legislative Assembly in 1952 from Jagdishpur. In 1963 she became the first woman cabinet minister of Bihar. Devi was born in Munger district on September 25, 1922 and died on February 3, 2001. 

She has served 4 times as MLA of Arrah from 1962 to 1969 and 1972 to 1980.

Personal life
Sumitra Devi was married to late Shri Gyaneshwar Prasad. They had two sons (Manjul Kumar and Raj Shekhar) and a daughter. She was the mother-in-law of Meira Kumar, a former Lok Sabha speaker.

References

2001 deaths
1922 births
State cabinet ministers of Bihar
Bihar MLAs 1952–1957
People from Munger district
Women members of the Bihar Legislative Assembly
Bihar MLAs 1962–1967
Indian National Congress politicians from Bihar
20th-century Indian women politicians
20th-century Indian politicians
Women state cabinet ministers of India
Janata Party politicians